The George Ruffell Memorial Shield, also known as the Middlesex Super Cup is a cup that has been held every season since 1999 except 2008 between the holders of the Middlesex Senior Cup and the Middlesex Charity Cup. In 2001, because the Middlesex Charity Cup was not completed in the 2000-01 season, the winners of the Middlesex Senior Cup, Uxbridge, played against the previous winners of the Middlesex Charity Cup, Hayes. There was no competition in the calendar year 2005 because the match was moved from the beginning of the season to the end of the season. In 2008, the competition was not played because the Middlesex Charity Cup was not completed.

Winners

George Ruffell

George Ruffell was a long-standing member of the Middlesex FA. After he died in 1998 the cup was established in his honour and it raises money for Macmillan Cancer Support.

Precursors

Prior to the establishment of this competition, there were two less formal events for which the winners of the Middlesex Senior Cup were invited at the start of the following campaign.  The first of these was the Merthr-Middlesex Charity Shield (inaugurated at the start of season 1990/1), and this was superseded by the Melksham-Middlesex Charity Shield.  The first of these competitions was promoted by Russell Grant, the television personality and patron of a number of sports clubs in Middlesex.  The game was instigated to raise funds for the Harefield Hospital, Middlesex's famous heart hospital, and involved Merthyr Tydfil FC as it came from the area of the UK - South Wales - with one of the highest rates of heart disease, reportedly because of risks associated with the mining industry.  This event had disappeared by 1997/8, when the Federation of Middlesex Sport, using a contact in Wiltshire, instigated the successor, which it is believed, was contested only on this single occasion.  Neither of these Charity Shield single-match competitions was an official Middlesex County FA event, but both were sanctioned and tacitly supported by the county.  As with the Middlesex Super Cup, drawn matches went straight to a penalty shoot-out, without extra time.

The following results are known; it is not known whether any other editions of these were played:

MERTHYR-MIDDLESEX CHARITY SHIELD

11.08.1990 Merthyr Tydfil 2-2 Staines Town (Staines won 3-2 on penalties)

06.08.1994 Merthyr Tydfil 5-1 Staines Town

MELKSHAM-MIDDLESEX CHARITY SHIELD

02.08.1997 Melksham Town 1-2 Staines Town

Football competitions in England
County Cup competitions
Recurring sporting events established in 1999
1999 establishments in England
Sport in Middlesex